Spectamen rikae is a species of sea snail, a gastropod mollusk that used to belong in the family Solariellidae.

This species, described as a marine species, is actually terrestrial. It has therefore become a Cyclophoridae incertae sedis

Description
This shell grows to a height of 9 mm.

Distribution
This species was found in the Philippines.

References

 Vilvens C. (2003). Description of Spectamen rikae n.sp. (Gastropoda: Trochidae: Solariellinae) from the Philippine Islands. Novapex 4(1): 17-20
 Poppe G.T., Tagaro S.P. & Dekker H. (2006) The Seguenziidae, Chilodontidae, Trochidae, Calliostomatidae and Solariellidae of the Philippine Islands. Visaya Supplement 2: 1–228. page(s): 139

External links
 

Cyclophoridae
Gastropods described in 2003